Bottrop-Boy station is located in the German city of Bottrop in the German state of North Rhine-Westphalia. It is on the Oberhausen-Osterfeld Süd–Hamm line and is classified by Deutsche Bahn as a category 6 station.

The station was opened between 1925 and 1927 by Deutsche Reichsbahn.

It is served by Rhine-Ruhr S-Bahn line S 9 (Recklinghausen / Haltern am See and Wuppertal - Hagen),  operating every 30 minutes during the day. It is also served by three bus routes: 260 (every 20 minutes), 265 (every 20 minutes) and 266 (every 60 minutes), all operated by Vestische Straßenbahnen.

Notes

Rhine-Ruhr S-Bahn stations
S9 (Rhine-Ruhr S-Bahn)
Buildings and structures in Bottrop
Railway stations in Germany opened in 1925